The Macchi MB.320 was an Italian cabin monoplane designed and built by Macchi. Only a small number were built.

Design and development
The MB.320 was a low-wing cabin monoplane powered by two wing-mounted Continental E185 engines. It had room for a pilot and five passengers. The aircraft flew well, but was expensive to buy with only a small domestic market for the type and only a small number were exported. Three aircraft were sold to East African Airways for use as feederliners. It was intended that the aircraft would be built in France under licence as the Lignel VEMA-51 but in the end none were built.

Specifications (Macchi MB.320)

References

Citations

Bibliography
 
 

M.B.320
1940s Italian civil utility aircraft
Low-wing aircraft
Aircraft first flown in 1949
Twin piston-engined tractor aircraft